Henning Palner (18 July 1932 – 20 December 2018) was a Danish actor.

Filmography
Jetpiloter – 1961
Støv på hjernen – 1961
Komtessen – 1961
Sorte Shara – 1961
Det støver stadig – 1962
Drømmen om det hvide slot – 1962
Vi voksne – 1963
Støv for alle pengene – 1963
Slottet – 1964
Passer passer piger – 1964
Den røde kappe – 1967
Bejleren – en jysk røverhistorie – 1975
Strømer – 1976
Affæren i Mølleby – 1976
Skytten – 1977
Pas på ryggen, professor – 1977
Terror – 1977
Vil du se min smukke navle? – 1978
Vinterbørn – 1978
Olsen-banden går i krig – 1978
Krigernes børn – 1979
Et rigtigt menneske – 2001
Solkongen (film) – 2005

External links
 
  Henning Palner at Danskefilm.dk

1932 births
2018 deaths
Danish male film actors
People from Helsingør